Events from the year 1921 in Croatia.

Incumbents
 Monarchs:
Peter I (until 16 August)
Alexander I (from 16 August)

Events

Arts and literature

Sport

Births
February 18 – Branko Bauer, film director (died 2002)
March 27 – Ivan Rabuzin, painter (died 2008)
March 28 – Walter Neugebauer, comic book artist and animator (died 1992)
May 4 – Edo Murtić, painter (died 2005)
June 10 – Ivan Kožarić, sculptor (died 2020)
June 22 – Radovan Ivšić, poet and dramatist (died 2009)
November 27 – Vojin Jelić, writer and poet (died 2004)

Deaths
January 23 – Josip Marohnić, influential emigrant in the Americas (born 1866)

References

 
Years of the 20th century in Croatia
Croatia